Pakistan Music Stars is a music reality television show by ARY Digital Network which is aired every Sunday at 9:00pm on ARY Digital.

Synopsis
This show is different from the music reality shows happened in the past. The format of this show is there will be six teams led by six prominent members of the Pakistan Music Industry who compete against one another for the title of the "Ultimate Pop Sensation". Each singer will have four local singers in their teams and work together the entire show. After round encounters between these six teams only four will advance to the semi-finals and only two to the Grand Finale.
The show is hosted by Nouman Javaid & VJ Anoushey Ashraf.

Auditions
The candidates for this show were called in for auditions in July 2011 by the organizers. Over three hundred people auditioned, but only twenty-six got in.

Team selections
Out of those twenty-six candidates, twenty-four of them were selected via balloting done by the captains, while two candidates were rejected.

Format
The format of this show is different from the past music reality shows of Pakistan. Out of the six professionals leading their teams of four local celebrities, two of them will compete against one another, while the rest of the four will judge the performances along with the audience. The toss of the coin determines who will perform first or give the chance to perform first to the other.
The show comprises four different segments in which teams will compete against one another to score the maximum points.
The segments of this show are as follows:
Ikkay Pe Ikka
Aar Ya Paar
Awaz Ka Jadoo
Zarra Hut Kay

Ikkay Pe Ikka
In this segment, one team member from each performs two songs. Both the local talents from each team take turns to perform. Then after their performance, their score is decided by the audience and the four judges by voting from one to ten. After the first performances from both sides comes the second performance.

Aar Ya Paar
Aar Ya Paar is duet round in which one member from each team perform a duet while they are judged individually by the audience & the judges.

Awaz Ka Jadoo
In this round, one member from each team takes turns to perform a song which demonstrates their talent. After that, the audience and judges hand out the points.

Zara Hut Kay
In this round, the team captains perform a medley with their entire team, then the audience votes on their favourite.

Judges
There are six judges, but only four judge each episode, while the remaining two appear as the team captains. The judges are Fariha Pervez, Sheraz Uppal, Haroon (singer) Rashid, Faakhir Mehmood, Rahim Shah, and Rameez Mukhtar (Fuzön).

Haroon (singer) joined & replaced Ahmed Jahanzeb, who was unavailable for the show.

Participating contestants
Twenty-six contestants were selected after the auditions for the main event. The names of the contestants are:
Ali Raza (Karachi)
Nauman Shafi (Karachi)
Nazia (Karachi)
Shaz Khan (Karachi)
Waqas Azeem (Karachi)
Wajeeh Uddin (Karachi)
Imran Ali (Karachi)
Rafeh Ali (Karachi)
Anmol (Lahore)
Azeem ([Faisalabad])
Ahmer Abbas (Karachi)
Ali Raza (Karachi)
Abdul Qadir (Karachi)
Amjad Warsi (Karachi)
Latif Ali (Hyderabad) - Latif (due to some personal problems) was later replaced by Zain Hassan from Lahore.
Ali Asad (Karachi)
Faraz Ali (Karachi)
Ghazal Ali (Karachi)
Abdul Basit (Karachi)
Hina Makhani (Karachi)
Mohammad Raheel Langa (Karachi)
Kashif Khan (Lahore)
Kumail Abbas (Karachi)
Asad Ali (Karachi)
Tauqeer Tahir (Lahore)
Rose Merry (Karachi)
Humera
Twenty-four contestants out of these twenty-six were selected, but Imran Ali and Nazia were sent home.

Participating teams
There are six teams in the show. The names of the teams are:

Episodes

Nineteen episodes of the show has been announced. The first episode aired on 4 September 2011. Then there was a two-week gap, so the second episode of the show was aired on 25 September 2011. Now, new episodes are aired once every week.

Letterboard 
Each team will play five-round matches against the other team. The top four teams will advance to the semi-finals. Below is the points table for the current statistics.

References

Pakistani pop singers
Singing talent shows
Urdu-language television shows
Pakistani television series
ARY Digital original programming
2011 Pakistani television series debuts
Pakistani reality television series